Fawaz bin Mohammed al-Nashimi (died June 2004), also known as Turki bin Fuheid al-Muteiry, was a member of Al-Qaeda in the Arabian Peninsula and was identified by the group as the 20th hijacker of the September 11th attacks.  Born in Saudi Arabia, Nashimi participated in the 2004 Khobar massacre and successfully escaped Saudi security forces.  He was killed by Saudi forces in June 2004.

On June 21, 2006, a US intelligence contractor in Virginia, IntelCenter, released a 54-minute Al-Qaeda video in which Nashimi justifies attacking the Western World.  Several days before on June 13, an audio webpost supposedly from Al-Qaeda claimed that Nashimi was to have been the 20th hijacker on United Airlines Flight 93, but was unable to participate at the planned time.

References

2004 deaths
Saudi Arabian al-Qaeda members
Deaths by firearm in Saudi Arabia
Year of birth missing
Saudi Arabian mass murderers